William Beaumont Busby (1757 – 31 August 1820) was Dean of Rochester from 1808 to 1820.

He was born in 1757 and educated at Winchester and New College, Oxford. Appointed 43rd Chaplain to the Speaker of the House of Commons by Speaker Henry Addington in 1796, he was Rector  of Upper Heyford, Oxfordshire, and then Canon of the First Stall, St George's Chapel, Windsor, from 1803 to 1808 before his elevation to the Deanery.

He died on 31 August 1820.

References

1757 births
People educated at Winchester College
Alumni of New College, Oxford
Chaplains of the House of Commons (UK)
Canons of Windsor
Deans of Rochester
1820 deaths